Louise Robinson (born 12 January 1965) is a British cyclist. She took the silver medal at the inaugural women's race at the UCI Cyclo-cross World Championships in 2000. She also competed in the women's cross-country mountain biking event at the 2000 Summer Olympics.

References

External links
 

1965 births
Living people
British female cyclists
Olympic cyclists of Great Britain
Cyclists at the 2000 Summer Olympics
Place of birth missing (living people)